Adrenaline Rush is the third studio album by rapper Twista, released on June 24, 1997. It was his second album nationally released, after his previous effort Resurrection was shelved outside of Chicago. The album had guest artists: Johnny P, Liffy Stokes, Miss Kane, Malif, Mayz and Turtle Banks. The first single off the album was "Emotions", a song which reworked the chorus of the Do or Die hit "Po Pimp" (on which Twista was featured). The single "Get It Wet" charted on the Billboard Hot 100 at number 96. With very little airplay or radio play outside the midwest, the album was certified platinum by the Recording Industry Association of America (RIAA) on July 15, 2019.

A sequel to the album, Adrenaline Rush 2007, was released in 2007 on Atlantic Records.

Track listing 
All tracks produced by The Legendary Traxster

Charts

Weekly charts

Year-end charts

Singles

Certifications

References 

1997 albums
Twista albums
Atlantic Records albums
Albums produced by The Legendary Traxster
Gangsta rap albums by American artists